Multiply is the first single from Xzibit's album, Man vs. Machine. The chorus is rapped by Nate Dogg. In the music video it shows Xzibit riding on a car. An official remix featuring Busta Rhymes was released as a bonus track in the same album. The video contains cameo appearances by Busta Rhymes, Dr. Dre and WC.

Track listings

CD Single (UK 673 155-2) 
 Multiply (explicit) (04:11)
 Multiply (Clean Radio version) (03:50)
 Get Your Walk On (feat. WC + Dat Nigga Daz) 05:02
 Multiply (Video)

Charts

References 

2002 singles
Xzibit songs
Song recordings produced by Mr. Porter
2002 songs
Nate Dogg songs
Songs written by Xzibit
Songs written by Nate Dogg
Loud Records singles
Songs written by Denaun Porter